Gerhard Weissenbacher (born 1941 in Vienna) is an Austrian painter and art educator and the author of a two-volume  on the architectural history of the Vienna district of Hietzing.

Life 
After graduating from the Bundesrealgymnasium Wien XV in 1961, Weissenbacher studied from 1961 until 1966 at the Academy of Fine Arts Vienna under the professors Josef Dobrowsky,  and Max Weiler; at the same time he studied art history and history at the University of Vienna. In 1966, he passed the teacher's examination for art education and history and obtained his diploma as an academic painter. From 1966 to 2001, Weissenbacher worked as an AHS teacher and spent an extended period in West Africa (Liberia). He also lived in Paris between 1978 and 1979. In 1982, Weissenbacher began his many years of research on the architectural development of Vienna's 13th district, which resulted in the publication of the two volumes In Hietzing gebaut. Geschichte und Architektur eines Wiener Gemeindebezirkes.

In 2002, he received the 1952 Decoration of Honour for Services to the Republic of Austria.

Artistic works by Weissenbacher are in the possession of the Albertina, the Federal Ministry of Education, Science and Culture, the Lower Austrian Government, the State Gallery of the Principality of Liechtenstein and private collections.

References

External links 
 
 

20th-century Austrian painters
Austrian art historians
Austrian contemporary artists
University of Vienna alumni
1941 births
Living people
Artists from Vienna
Recipients of the Decoration of Honour for Services to the Republic of Austria